The discography of Eazy-E, an American rapper from Compton, California, consists of two studio albums, three extended plays, two compilation albums, and ten singles. Eazy was also featured on the single "Game Wreck-Oniz-Iz Game" by Above the Law and "Foe tha Love of $" by Bone Thugs-n-Harmony. His music has been released through record labels Ruthless Records, Priority Records, Relativity Records, and Epic Records. Five of his albums have been awarded a certification by the Recording Industry Association of America (RIAA). This discography includes music videos and collaborations as well as albums.

Eazy-E's music career started in 1986 with the hip hop group N.W.A, where he would perform on all four of the studio albums. In 1988, before Ice Cube left N.W.A, Eazy released Eazy-Duz-It as his first solo effort. Eazy-Duz-It peaked at number 41 on the Billboard 200 and became Eazy's most successful album, selling 2.5 million albums in the US by 1994. In 1992 it was certified double Platinum by the RIAA. The album's first single, "Eazy-er Said Than Dunn", would go on to peak at number 84 on the Hot R&B/Hip-Hop Songs. "Eazy-Duz-It" was released in 1989 and only charted on the Hot Dance Singles Sales chart. "We Want Eazy" was also released in 1989 and charted on both the Hot Rap Tracks chart and the Hot R&B/Hip-Hop Songs chart.

5150: Home 4 tha Sick was released on December 28, 1992, and peaked number 70 on the Billboard 200. The EP spawned only one single, "Only If You Want It", which failed to chart. It's On (Dr. Dre) 187um Killa, Eazy's second EP, was released on November 5, 1993. The album peaked at number five on the Billboard 200 and went 2 x multi platinum on February 7, 1994. That EP remains as the only Hip Hop EP to go Multiplatinum. It spawned two singles: "Real Muthaphuckkin G's" and "Any Last Werdz". "Real Muthaphuckkin G's" became Eazy's highest-charting single on the Billboard Hot 100, peaking at number 42. It also charted at number two on the Hot Rap Tracks and number 21 on the Hot Dance Singles Sales. The second single, "Any Last Werdz", failed to chart.

In 1994, "Luv 4 Dem Gangsta'z", originally featured on the Beverly Hills Cop III soundtrack, was released as a single. Released in 1995, Eternal E became Eazy's first compilation, peaking at number 84 on the Billboard 200. It was certified gold by the RIAA in 2003. Str8 off tha Streetz of Muthaphukkin Compton, Eazy's first and only posthumous studio album to date, was released in November 1995. The album became his best charting album on the Billboard 200, peaking at number three. Its only single "Just tah Let U Know" became one of Eazy's most successful singles, charting at number 45 on the Billboard Hot 100. On March 26, 2002, Impact of a Legend was released and peaked number 113 on the Billboard 200. In 2007, Featuring...Eazy-E was released, and in 2010, a box set entitled Tri-Pack was released.

Albums

Studio albums

Extended plays

Compilation albums

Singles

As lead artist

Notes
A ^ Did not chart in 1987, charted in 2015.

As featured artist

Unreleased Songs

Eazy-E had some unreleased songs in the Ruthless Records Vaults that were later Remixed for “Impact Of A Legend” & “Ruthless Records Tenth Anniversary: Decade of Game”. However, some still remain unreleased.

24 Hours To Live [Original] (Produced By Homicide) (Lost)

B.N.K. [Original] (Produced By Homicide) (Found)

House Party (G.B.M. Featuring Eazy-E) (Found)

Mr. Bill Collector [Original] (Bone Thugs-N-Harmony Featuring Eazy-E) (Snippet Available)

No More Tears (G.B.M. Featuring Eazy-E) (Found)

Sleepwalkers [Original] featuring BG Knocc Out & Flesh-N-Bone (Lost)

Strictly For My Grind (Bone Thugs-N-Harmony Featuring Eazy-E) (Rumored Eazy recorded and finished the song with Bone Thugs) (Lost)

Woodworks (G.B.M. Featuring Eazy-E) (Found)

Music videos

See also
N.W.A discography

References

Hip hop discographies
Discographies of American artists
Eazy-E